Keith Hampshire (born 23 November 1945) is an English-born singer and actor. He recorded three songs which were top ten hits in Canada, and hosted the CBC Television show Keith Hampshire's Music Machine. His voice has been compared to David Clayton-Thomas. In the United States his highest charting single,"Daytime Night-time", reached No. 51 on Hot 100.

Early life
Hampshire was born in Dulwich, London, England.  He moved with his family to Canada at the age of six. He lived in Toronto and later Calgary, where he took singing lessons, and formed several short-lived high-school bands which performed in local venues.

Career
After graduating from high school, Hampshire began working as a radio disk jockey. Between July 1966 and mid-August 1967, He lived in the UK and was a DJ for the offshore pirate radio station Radio Caroline South. His show was called "Keefer's Commotions", and later "Keefer's Uprising".

Beginning in 1971, Hampshire recorded a number of pop music singles, including his #1 version of "The First Cut Is the Deepest", which topped the RPM 100 national singles chart in May 1973.

In 1974, Hampshire was nominated for a Juno Award as Male Vocalist of the Year.  That year he became the host of the CBC Television show Keith Hampshire's Music Machine.

In 1981, Hampshire released an album, Variations, through Freedom Records.

In 1983, Hampshire, with the Bat Boys, recorded a song entitled "OK Blue Jays" which became an unofficial anthem for the Toronto Blue Jays Major League Baseball team. Blue Jays fans frequently sing it during the seventh-inning stretch of home games. The song was written by Alan Smith, Pat Arbour, Jack Lenz and Tony Kosinec. The song was remixed by Rob Wells and Chris Anderson of Big Honkin' Spaceship Inc. in 2003.

On 18 June 2005, Hampshire was hired to host a 1960s–1970s based oldies radio show on CHAY-FM in Barrie, Ontario. That year 20th Century Masters released an album of his past singles, The Millennium Collection: The Best of Keith Hampshire.

Filmography
1972-1973: Festival of Family Classics - Additional voices
1983: Rock & Rule - Other Computers
1986: Madballs: Escape from Orb! - Hornhead
1987: Madballs: Gross Jokes - Hornhead / British Narrator
1987: The Care Bears Adventure in Wonderland - Madhatter / Jabberwocky
1987-1988: The Care Bears Family - Mr. Dragon / Shakey the Sea Serpent / Songfellow Strum
1989: Beetlejuice - Additional voices
1989-1991: Babar - Additional voices
1990: The Nutcracker Prince - Mouse / Guest / Second Guard / Contestant / Spectator / Soldier
1990-1991: The Raccoons - Pig One
1991-1992: The Advnetures of Tintin - Additional voices (English version)
1993-1994: The Busy World of Richard Scarry - Additional voices
1994: Monster Force - Additional voices
1998: Laura's Happy Adventures - Mr. Morris
2001-2003: Pecola - Additional voices (English version)

Discography

Singles
 1967 - "Millions of Hearts" (b/w Lonely Boy)
 1971 - "Ebenezer" (b/w Sing Angel Sing) (#81 Canada)
 1972 - "Daytime Night-time" (b/w Turned the Other Way) (#5 Canada),(#51 US)
 1973 - "The First Cut Is the Deepest" (b/w You Can't Hear the Song I Sing) (#1 Canada), (#70 US)
 1973 - "Big Time Operator" (b/w You Can't Hear the Song I Sing) (#5 Canada), (#81 US)
 1974 - "For Ever and Ever" (b/w Jeraboah) (#47 Canada)
 1974 - "Hallelujah Freedom" (b/w Waking Up Alone) (#59 Canada)
 1976 - "I'm Into Something Good" (b/w Just Another Fool)
 1981 - "I Can't Wait Too Long" (b/w Nobody's Child)
 1983 - "OK Blue Jays" (b/w same) (#47 Canada) - as "The Bat Boys"

Albums
 1972 - Oops! (original cast recording)
 1973 - The First Cut
 1981 - Variations
 2005 - The Best of Keith Hampshire: The Millennium Collection

References

External links
 Official website
 

Living people
1945 births
English male singers
English rock singers
English songwriters
English radio personalities
English male voice actors
English emigrants to Canada
People from Dulwich
Canadian male singers
Canadian rock singers
Canadian songwriters
Canadian radio personalities
Canadian male voice actors
British male songwriters